Jeff Bhasker (born March 4, 1974) is an American record producer, songwriter, and multi-instrumentalist based in Los Angeles. He was awarded the Grammy Award for Producer of the Year in 2016 and nominated in 2013.

An accomplished producer, he came to prominence as one of the primary producers of Kanye West's influential 808s & Heartbreak and closely collaborated with West during the late 2000s on My Beautiful Dark Twisted Fantasy, Watch the Throne, his tours, and, later, Donda. In the following decade, Bhasker would go on to produce the albums Some Nights by Fun, Uptown Special with Mark Ronson, and Harry Styles' self-titled debut album, among other notable credits. 

His accolades include Grammy Awards for the songs "Run This Town" by Jay-Z, "All of the Lights" by Kanye West, "We Are Young" by Fun., and "Uptown Funk" by Mark Ronson.

Early life 
Bhasker was born in Kansas City, Kansas, and raised in Socorro, New Mexico. His American-born mother is a pianist and his Indian-born father, Ravi Bhasker, is a medical doctor who has served as Socorro's mayor for over 24 years. Bhasker was introduced to jazz by his mother and his piano teacher. He played in the jazz band at Socorro High School, where he graduated in 1993, and then studied jazz piano and arranging at Berklee College of Music in Boston, Massachusetts.

Career
Bhasker began his career gigging around Boston as a keyboardist and played in a wedding band. After playing with the 1970s-era R&B band Tavares, Bhasker moved to New York on September 11, 2001. He toured with the jam band Lettuce and began focusing more on songwriting. One of his first productions was with neo soul singer Goapele, on her album Closer (2001). Bhasker produced a song on rapper The Game's first album, The Documentary (2005).

Bhasker relocated to Los Angeles, in 2005. He got a job doing demos for songwriter Diane Warren. He began writing with Bruno Mars, and songwriter and executive Steve Lindsey served as their mentor. He played cover songs in a band with Mars around Los Angeles. 

Around 2007, Bhasker began his association with rapper/producer Kanye West. Initially serving as a substitute keyboardist on the recommendation of his friend and West's tour DJ A-Trak, West was impressed with his musical ability and hired him for West's Glow in the Dark Tour as his musical director. He was set to be the musical director for the cancelled Fame Kills: Starring Kanye West and Lady Gaga, before going on to be the music director of Lady Gaga's The Monster Ball Tour. Bhasker collaborated on West's albums 808s & Heartbreak, My Beautiful Dark Twisted Fantasy and the Jay-Z/Kanye West collaboration album, Watch the Throne, including the songs "Welcome to Heartbreak". "Lift Off", and "Runaway". Bhasker received the Grammy Award for Best Rap Song for West's "All of the Lights", and the Jay-Z/Rihanna/Kanye West song "Run This Town". Bhasker and West reunited on "Come to Life" on 2021's Donda.

Following this period, Bhasker would go on to produce Fun's Some Nights (2012), Uptown Special (2015) with Mark Ronson, and Harry Styles' self-titled debut album (2017). Bhasker's collaborations span multiple genres, including his work with Alicia Keys, Mark Ronson, Kid Cudi, Cam, Taylor Swift, Harry Styles, Young Thug, and more. 

Bhasker co-wrote and co-produced Mark Ronson's single "Uptown Funk", which earned him a 2016 Grammy Award for Record of the Year. Additionally, he received the 2016 Grammy Award for Producer of the Year, Non-Classical for his achievements in producing that year.

His RIAA multi-platinum selling records include Kanye West's "Love Lockdown", "Runaway", "Monster" and "Power", Jay-Z's "Run this Town", Drake's "Find Your Love", Fun's "We Are Young", "Some Nights" and "Carry On", Pink's "Just Give Me a Reason", Bruno Mars' "Talking to the Moon" and "Locked out of Heaven", Mark Ronson's "Uptown Funk", Rihanna's "Kiss it Better"and Harry Styles' "Sign of the Times".

Musical style
As a vocalist, Bhasker has used the aliases Billy Cravens and U.G.L.Y. He explained his reasons in a ninterview with GQ: 

 when speaking on the Billy Cravens pseudonym in 2013, he said "I just thought it was a cooler sounding name, and I was making these kind of dark pop songs that suited it. It's kinda like Billy Joel meets Wes Craven."

Discography

Awards and nominations

Grammy Awards

Filmography
 A Man Named Scott (2021) – Himself

References

American hip hop record producers
American hip hop singers
American male singers
American male musicians of Indian descent
American musicians of Indian descent
APRA Award winners
Berklee College of Music alumni
GOOD Music artists
Grammy Award winners for rap music
Living people
People from Socorro, New Mexico
Songwriters from New Mexico
21st-century American keyboardists
21st-century American musicians
21st-century American male musicians
1974 births
American male songwriters